Eldorado Springs is an unincorporated community, a census-designated place (CDP) and a post office located in and governed by Boulder County, Colorado, United States. The CDP is a part of the Boulder, CO Metropolitan Statistical Area. The Eldorado Springs post office has the ZIP code 80025 (post office boxes). At the 2010 United States census, the population of the Eldorado Springs CDP was 585, while the population of the 80025 ZIP Code Tabulation Area was 253.

The nearby Eldorado Canyon State Park is famous for its classic North-American climbing routes.

History
In 1916, Dwight and Mamie Eisenhower celebrated their honeymoon in one of the cabins at the resort. Also known for its good tasting spring water, "Eldorado Springs" bottled water is sold in stores around Colorado.

Notable residents
Pansy Stockton (1895–1972), artist
Mark Emery Udall (1950- ), U.S. Senator

Geography
To the southwest is Eldorado Mountain.

Climate
<div style="width:100%;">

Demographics

See also

Outline of Colorado
Index of Colorado-related articles
State of Colorado
Colorado cities and towns
Colorado census designated places
Colorado counties
Boulder County, Colorado
List of statistical areas in Colorado
Front Range Urban Corridor
North Central Colorado Urban Area
Denver-Aurora-Boulder, CO Combined Statistical Area
Boulder, CO Metropolitan Statistical Area
Eldorado Canyon State Park

References

External links

Eldorado Springs @ Colorado.com
Eldorado Springs @ UncoverColorado.com
Eldorado Canyon State Park
Boulder County website

Census-designated places in Boulder County, Colorado
Climbing areas of Colorado
Census-designated places in Colorado